Catoptria pinella is a species of moth of the family Crambidae. It is found in Europe, North Africa and across the Palearctic.

The wingspan is 18–24 mm. The face has a short cone. Forewings ferruginous-ochreous; a shining white broadly dilating median streak from base to 4, cut in middle by a dark brown oblique bar, posterior portion edged with dark brown; second line obscurely brown towards costa; cilia shining brownish. Hindwings are light grey. The larva is dull reddish-grey; spots black, head and plate of 2 black.

The moth flies from July to August depending on the location.

The larvae feed on various grasses.

References

External links
 Catoptria pinella at UKmoths
 Lepiforum.de

Crambini
Moths of Asia
Moths of Europe
Moths of Africa
Moths described in 1758
Taxa named by Carl Linnaeus